This article is the discography of British rock band Mungo Jerry.

Albums

Studio albums

Live albums

Compilation albums

Singles

Notes

References 

Discographies of British artists
Rock music group discographies